"An American Family" is a song written by Bob Corbin, and recorded by American country music group The Oak Ridge Boys.  It was released in 1989 as the first single from the album American Dreams.  The song reached #4 on the Billboard Hot Country Singles & Tracks chart.

Content
The song describes a typical American family, and notes that they aren't a big deal and "ain't gonna go down in history", but they are just part of "a little story of an American family." The first verse of the song describes a husband, who worked in a rail yard and is nearing retirement, and his loving wife. The second verse tells how the wife waited for her husband while he fought in World War II and how their son fought in the Vietnam War. It also describes two other children, a son who is a lawyer in Los Angeles, and a daughter who married and stayed in her hometown.

The Oak Ridge Boys re-recorded the song for their patriotic album "Colors" in 2003. This version included a new bridge and chorus at the end of the song which referenced the September 11, 2001 terrorist attacks. The additions shift the focus of the song from a single family to America as a country, and say that all Americans are part of an American family that pulls together during hard times. The 2003 version was recorded with William Lee Golden, while Steve Sanders sang baritone on the original version.

Chart performance

Year-end charts

References

Songs about the United States
Songs about families
1989 singles
The Oak Ridge Boys songs
Song recordings produced by Jimmy Bowen
MCA Records singles
1989 songs
Songs written by Bob Corbin (songwriter)